The Church of Saint Paul and Saint Andrew is a historic United Methodist church located in the Upper West Side of New York City, New York, on West 86th Street. The Church is known for being socially liberal and for accepting all people.  The Church hosts a number of performing arts groups, including Camerata Notturna, Riverside Orchestra, and New Plaza Cinema.



History
At present, the Church of St. Paul & St. Andrew (SPSA) is a member of the Reconciling Ministries Network of the United Methodist Church and its New York Annual Conference affiliate, Methodists in New Directions (MIND). The congregation welcomes all who wish to worship God the Creator, God the Redeemer and God the Holy Spirit; without regard to any arbitrary condition.  The 2010 Service of Lessons and Carols was featured on 31 December 2010 on the CBS Television Network.  The senior pastor is Rev. Dr. James (K) Karpen and the associate pastor is Rev. Lea Matthews.  Ekama Eni serves as Minister for Young Adults and Frank Glass is the Minister of Music.  SPSA also serves as host sanctuary for Congregation B'nai Jeshuran.  Also housed at 263 West 86th Street are the West Side Campaign Against Hunger, a food pantry and nutritional resource center, and West End Theatre, presenting many performing arts companies.  The church building was declared a landmark by the New York City Landmarks Preservation Commission in 1981.

References

External links

Churches in Manhattan
United Methodist churches in New York City
Italianate architecture in New York City
20th-century Methodist church buildings
Upper West Side
New York City Designated Landmarks in Manhattan
West End Avenue
Robert Henderson Robertson buildings
Churches completed in 1897
19th-century Methodist church buildings in the United States
Renaissance Revival architecture in New York City
Religious organizations established in 1834
1834 establishments in New York (state)
Italianate church buildings in the United States